David Flitwick (died 1296), of Flitwick, Bedfordshire, was an English politician and soldier of the Anglo-Scots Wars.

Career and Life
Flitwick was summoned to Parliament for the Bedfordshire constituency on 27 Nov 1295. He died during Edward I's Invasion of Scotland and Edward ordered Flitwick's lands to be seized whilst staying at Roxburgh on 3 Jun 1296. The Inquisition post mortem held found Flitwick to have been in possession of the manor of Flitwick and wardship of Skipton Castle.

Family
Flitwick was succeeded by his son David Flitwick (1266–1311), who married Lora Gumbaud. The younger Flitwick was succeeded by David Flitwick.

References

English knights
English people of the Wars of Scottish Independence
English MPs 1295
1296 deaths
People from Flitwick
History of Bedfordshire